The 5th Vermont Infantry Regiment was a three years' infantry regiment in the Union Army during the American Civil War.

Structure
The 5th Vermont Infantry was part of the Army of the Potomac, in the Vermont Brigade of the Sixth Army Corps. It included a total of 1618 soldiers. The regiment was mustered into Federal service on September 16, 1861, at St. Albans, Vermont. The regiment lost during service: 201 men killed and mortally wounded, 4 died from accident, 1 executed, 21 died in Confederate prisons and 112 died from disease; total loss: 339. The regiment mustered out of service on June 29, 1865.

Notable soldiers
 Charles G. Gould, Captain and Medal of Honor recipient.
 Lewis A. Grant, Major in the 5th VVI and Medal of Honor recipient.
 Lester G. Hack, Medal of Honor recipient.
 Jackson Sargent, Medal of Honor recipient.
 Robert Pratt, Captain in the 5th VVI and Mayor of Minneapolis, MN.

Battles
The 5th Regiment participated in the (listed chronologically) following engagements:

Final Statement

See also
 Vermont in the Civil War
 Vermont Brigade

Notes

References

External links
 Vermont National Guard Library and Museum
 5th Vermont Infantry Portrait Gallery

Units and formations of the Union Army from Vermont
Vermont Brigade
1861 establishments in Vermont
Vermont in the American Civil War